The Judo Federation of Armenia, is the regulating body of judo in Armenia, governed by the Armenian Olympic Committee. The headquarters of the federation is located in Yerevan.

History
The Federation was established in 1992 and the current president is Vardan Voskanyan. The Federation is a full member of the International Judo Federation and the European Judo Union. Armenian judo athletes participate in various European, international and Olympic level judo competitions, including the World Judo Championships. The Federation maintains cooperation with the Georgian and Russian Judo Federations, including joint training activities.

See also
 Sport in Armenia

References

External links 
 Judo Federation of Armenia on Twitter

Sports governing bodies in Armenia
Judo in Armenia
National members of the International Judo Federation